"Girl Anachronism" is a song by American dark cabaret duo The Dresden Dolls, released as a promo single from their self-titled debut album. The lyrics, alternately angry, apologetic, and full of complaint, deal with Amanda Palmer, the band's lead singer, as a "problem child", a trait which she blames on the fact that she was born a few days premature, by Caesarean section. As the song grows, the lyrics split into various subplots, all of which are related to feeling out of place or out of time.

This song was used at the end credits of season three, episode five of the Showtime television series Weeds.

The song ranked at number 30 on the 2004 Australian national music chart, Triple J's Hottest 100.

Inspiration 

In The Dresden Dolls Companion, Amanda Palmer, born in 1976, explains that she "always felt like the twenties or the sixties would have made more sense [to be born into]", thus prompting her to write this song in an attempt to express those feelings.

Music video 

The video for this single was shot, cut, and directed in 2003 by Michael Pope. It is focused mostly on the subplots of the song with shots of the band interposed. Like the song itself, it deals mainly with feelings of ill-belonging.

Track listing 

 "Girl Anachronism" – 3:03
 "The Jeep Song (LB/JM – Radio Edit)" – 4:19
 "Bad Habit"

Some copies contained only the first track.

Personnel 

 Amanda Palmer - piano, vocals, lyricist
 Brian Viglione - drums

Notes

External links 

 
 Music video director's site, including the music video

2003 singles
The Dresden Dolls songs
Songs written by Amanda Palmer
2001 songs
Roadrunner Records singles